Acromantis dyaka is a species of praying mantis native to Borneo.

See also
List of mantis genera and species

References

dyaka
Mantodea of Southeast Asia
Endemic fauna of Borneo
Insects of Borneo
Insects described in 1920